Untrapped: The Story of Lil Baby is a 2022 documentary film centered on rapper Lil Baby, directed by Karam Gill. It premiered at the Tribeca Film Festival on June 11, 2022, and was released on Amazon Prime Video on August 26, 2022.

Summary
The film follows the story of rapper Lil Baby's life and career. Born Dominique Jones, he was arrested and sent to prison as a teenager. After being released from prison in 2016 at age 21, he started a rap career, releasing his debut mixtape, Perfect Timing, in 2017, and then his album, My Turn, in 2020, which reached number 1 on the Billboard 200. The film includes archival footage of Lil Baby's childhood in Atlanta and adolescence as a drug dealer, and present-day footage with his children. It touches on social issues, such as the 2020 Black Lives Matter protests, and Lil Baby's relationship with the late Atlanta rapper Lil Marlo.     It includes interviews with rappers Young Thug, Gunna, and Drake.

Cast
 Lil Baby
 Young Thug
 Gunna
 Drake

Release
The film premiered at the Tribeca Film Festival on June 11, 2022, where it was followed by a six-song set performed by Lil Baby. It was released on Prime Video on August 26, 2022.

References

External links 
 

2022 films
2022 documentary films
American documentary films
Documentary films about hip hop music and musicians
Amazon Studios films
2020s English-language films
2020s American films